Hedi Boukhris (born 12 July 1986) is a retired Tunisian football defender.

References

1986 births
Living people
Tunisian footballers
ES Zarzis players
US Monastir (football) players
EGS Gafsa players
CS Hammam-Lif players
Association football defenders
Tunisian Ligue Professionnelle 1 players